was a soldier in the Imperial Japanese Army and politician. He was famous for having twice tried to stage a coup against the civilian government in the 1930s.

Early career
Hashimoto was born in Okayama City, and a graduate of the 23rd class of the Imperial Japanese Army Academy in 1911. He subsequently graduated from the Army Staff College in 1920. The services of Aikido founder Morihei Ueshiba were offered to Hashimoto by Oomoto leader Onisaburo Deguchi. In April 1922, he was assigned to the Kwangtung Army in Manchuria and was stationed at Harbin. In 1923, he was sent on special assignment to Manzhouli, near the border with the Soviet Union. From September 1927 through June 1930, he was reassigned as military attaché to Turkey. On his return to Japan, he was posted to the Imperial Japanese Army General Staff, and headed a Russian studies department. He was promoted to colonel in August 1930 and became an instructor at the Army Staff College in October.

Political career 
From the middle of 1930, Hashimoto became increasingly involved in right-wing politics within the military, with active participation in various attempts at a coup d'état. He was also a founder of radical secret societies within the army.

Coup attempts 
Hashimoto actively participated in the March incident of 1931. The Sakurakai (Cherry Blossom Society) was secretly formed by him and Captain Isamu Chō. It sought political reform with the elimination of party government by a coup d'état and the establishment of a new cabinet under the control of the military to stamp out Japan's allegedly-corrupt politics, economy, and thought. That literally meant a reversal of the Westernization of Japan.

The attempt failed, but Hashimoto, along with Isamu Chō and Shūmei Ōkawa, organized a further coup, the Imperial Colors Incident, also known as the October Incident, with Sadao Araki. All the conspirators were arrested and transferred to other posts. There were also suspicions of the instigation by Hashimoto and Araki in the final attempt, the Military Academy Incident.

Radicalism 
Despite his failures, Hashimoto continued as an active radical thinker during World War II. He was involved in the Taisei Yokusankai (Imperial Rule Assistance Association). He proposed a nationalist one-party dictatorship. The militarists had strong industrial support but also “socialist-nationalist” sentiments on the part of radical officers like Hashimoto. Supporters of Fumimaro Konoe's "Right-Socialist" revolution (populist ideas, which were rooted in the poorest farmers, fishermen, and industrial workers) opposed the "right-wing" militarists represented by Senjuro Hayashi in the same "revolutionary grouping". Later receiving political patronage by Hiranuma Kiichirō, another right-wing politician with establishment links in the Japanese Navy links.

Hashimoto was later elected to the Japanese House of Representatives and became vice-president of the Diet of Japan. Throughout the war, the Yokusan Sonendan (Imperial Rule Assistance Young Men's Corps), under his leadership, had the mission of guiding the nationalist and militarist indoctrination of the youth.

Hashimoto was the senior Japanese officer in the region, and a few days after the sinking, he was quoted in US newspapers as saying "I had orders to fire." Still, US-Japanese relations continued to sour in the aftermath of the incident, which would eventually lead to the Pacific War.

Hashimoto greatly supported aggressive policies during the Second Sino-Japanese War and the Tripartite Pact with Nazi Germany and Fascist Italy in 1940, along with the other military extremists of the Imperial Japanese Army.

Later life 
After the end of the war, he was sentenced to life imprisonment in Sugamo Prison by the International Military Tribunal for the Far East. He died in 1957.

References

External links 
 
 

1890 births
1957 deaths
Imperial Rule Assistance Association politicians
Japanese fascists
Japanese people convicted of the international crime of aggression
Japanese politicians convicted of crimes
Japanese prisoners sentenced to life imprisonment
Members of the House of Representatives (Empire of Japan)
People convicted by the International Military Tribunal for the Far East
People from Okayama
Politicians from Okayama Prefecture
Prisoners sentenced to life imprisonment by international courts and tribunals